Zahimara Fantauzzi Rosado (born 9 December 1993) is a Puerto Rican footballer who plays as a forward. She has been a member of the Puerto Rico women's national team.

Early and personal life
Fantauzzi was raised in Maunabo.

International goals
Scores and results list Puerto Rico's goal tally first.

References

External links

1993 births
Living people
Women's association football forwards
Puerto Rican women's footballers
People from Maunabo, Puerto Rico
Puerto Rico women's international footballers
College women's soccer players in the United States
Valdosta State University alumni